St John's College School is a co-educational preparatory school founded in the 17th century for the education of the choristers of the Choir of St John's College, Cambridge, England. The 20 choristers are educated in the school, which comprises 460 boys and girls aged 4–13. The Head Master is Neil Chippington. The school is divided into two halves, Byron house for KG, T1, T2, Form 1 and Form 2 (Reception - Year 4) whilst the 2nd part of the school, further up Grange Road, is in charge of Forms 3-6 (Years 5-8).

The school has been awarded national Best Prep School and national Best Prep School Head in the Tatler Schools Awards. The most recent integrated inspection by the Independent Schools Inspectorate in 2013 rated the school as excellent across all categories apart from the quality of pupils’ achievements 
and learning which was graded "exceptional". Although exhibiting strength across all subject areas, as a choir school St John's is particularly successful in music. Between 2008 and 2013, 48 pupils obtained music awards to senior schools, including many non-choristers.

History
The school is believed to have been founded in 1661 with the appointment of "Mr Loosemore" to act as organist and for "lerning the choristers". Two endowments in the early 1680s in particular secured the continuous history of the Choir from the Restoration onwards. The 22nd Master of St John's, Bishop Gunning, gave money to support the 'maintenance of some singing youths'. The Senior Fellow, John Ambrose, set up a fund for the 'maintenance of a Quire in the Chapel'.

In 1819 an arrangement was made between St John's College and Trinity College to share a choir, organist and schoolmaster, and this continued until 1856. In this year John's again established its own school, in All Saint's Passage, which later moved to Bridge Street. From 1875, boys other than choristers and probationers were admitted.

In the early 1950s, owing partly to financial pressures, St John's College considered closing the school. However, the then organist George Guest opined that this would be detrimental to the future of the choir and urged the college to reconsider. He sought support for his cause from outside the college, from figures such as the composer Ralph Vaughan Williams, who wrote to the college saying "Save St John's Choir School at all costs". The Master of the College, J.S. Boys Smith was consequently persuaded to retain the school. It was moved to larger premises in its present location in Grange Road, Cambridge, and in 1955 had recruited over 100 pupils. This was still not considered sufficient to meet the needs of the choir and so in order to provide enough choristers of a sufficiently high standard, by 1957 a boarding house was opened catering for 26 boarders. The school doubled in size when it amalgamated with the former Byron House School in 1973. A new boarding house opened in 2010.

Notable alumni
Iestyn Davies
Harry Gregson-Williams
Ben Gummer
Will Hooley
Edward Hyde (Cambridge cricketer)
Simon Keenlyside
Nick Knight (cricketer)
Clive Mantle

See also 
List of choir schools

References

External links 
St John's College School Website

Educational institutions established in the 1660s
Schools in Cambridge
Choir schools in England
School
Preparatory schools in Cambridgeshire
1661 establishments in England